WBIS (1190 AM) was an American radio station broadcasting a News Talk Information format. Licensed to Annapolis, Maryland, United States, the station served the Baltimore, Maryland area.  The station was last owned by Nations Radio, LLC (a subsidiary of Potomac Radio, LLC).

On October 29, 2008, Leesburg, Virginia-based WAGE received a permit to move to 1190 kHz as well as to raise its power to 50 kW. (As of April 2010, WAGE and WBIS had effectively the same ownership.) On April 21, 2010, the FCC approved applications for WAGE to increase its daytime power to 50 kW and nighttime power to 1300 watts from different antenna sites on the new frequency.

On February 10, 2011, WBIS shut down in order to make room for WAGE's operations on 1190 kHz. The callsign WCRW was parked on this facility beginning on January 28 until it was moved to the former WAGE later in the year.

References

External links
CDBS Public Access - Station Search Details for DWCRW

BIS
Defunct radio stations in the United States
Radio stations disestablished in 2011
Radio stations established in 1947
BIS
1947 establishments in Maryland
2011 disestablishments in Maryland
BIS